King Mwene Mbandu I Lyondthzi Kapova was the 21st monarch of the Mbunda people in the southeast of present-day Angola before the Portuguese colonization of the Mbunda territory at the beginning of the 20th century, specifically Moxico. The prince played a significant role in the war against the Chokwe. He took over the reins of the Mbunda Kingdom from his nephew King Mwene Katavola II Musangu.

Early life
Prince (Munamwene) Mbandu Lyondthzi Kapova was the son of Vamwene Vukolo Ngimbu Kanchungwa, one of the daughters of Vamwene Ngambo Lyambayi.

See also
Mbunda Kingdom
Mbunda language
Mbunda people
List of The Rulers of the Mbunda Kingdom

References

Angolan royalty
19th century in Angola
1900s in Angola
1910s in Angola
19th-century rulers in Africa
20th-century rulers in Africa
20th-century Angolan people